Mount Lindesay may refer to:

Mount Lindesay (New South Wales),  a mountain within the Nandewar Range east of Narrabri in northern New South Wales, Australia
Mount Lindesay (Queensland), a mountain  within the McPherson Range, approximately 200 km south of Brisbane, Australia
Mount Lindesay National Park, a national park in Western Australia